This is a list of cricket grounds in Ireland, inclusive of all-Ireland.

Cricket was introduced to Ireland by the English in the towns of Kilkenny and Ballinasloe in the early 19th century.  The game increased in popularity until the early 1880s. The Land War in the 1880s resulting from the Irish Land Commission and a ban on playing "foreign" games by the Gaelic Athletic Association set back the spread of cricket. Anyone playing foreign games such as cricket would be banned from the extremely popular Irish games such as hurling and Gaelic football, which in turn had a detrimental impact on the game.  The ban was not lifted until 1970, after which time cricket has continued to grow in popularity.

Men's international venues 
For a full list of grounds that have staged men's international matches, see List of international men's cricket grounds in Ireland

Domestic Teams

Leinster Lightning
For a full list of grounds that Leinster Lightning have used as home grounds in first-class, List A or Twenty20 cricket, see List of Leinster Lightning grounds

Munster Reds
For a full list of grounds that Munster Reds have used as home grounds in Twenty20 cricket, see List of Munster Reds grounds

Northern Knights
For a full list of grounds that Northern Knights have used as home grounds in first-class, List A or Twenty20 cricket, see List of Northern Knights grounds

North West Warriors
For a full list of grounds that North West Warriors have used as home grounds in first-class, List A or Twenty20 cricket, see List of North West Warriors grounds

Other venues

First-class venues

List A venues

Defunct venues

Women's international venues

Notes

References

External links
Cricket Ireland Official Website

 
Cricket grounds
 Cricket grounds
Ireland